Gregory Eebolawola Kpiebaya (1933 – 31 May 2022) was a Ghanaian Roman Catholic prelate. He was bishop of Wa from 1974 to 1994 and archbishop of Tamale from 1994 to 2009.

References

1933 births
2022 deaths
Ghanaian Roman Catholic bishops
Ghanaian Roman Catholic archbishops
Bishops appointed by Pope John Paul II
Roman Catholic bishops of Wa
Roman Catholic archbishops of Tamale